Tian Wen can refer to: 

Lord Mengchang (died 279 BCE), personal name Tian Wen, aristocrat and statesman of the Qi Kingdom of ancient China
Heavenly Questions, section of the Classical Chinese poetry work Chuci
Tian-Wen, Miluo (天问街道), a subdistrict in Miluo City, Hunan province

See also
Tianwen (disambiguation)
Wen Tian (disambiguation)
Tian (disambiguation)
Wen (disambiguation)